Fredua is both a surname and given name. Notable people with the name include:

 Barima Fredua Agyeman (or Kwaku Dua I Panyin) (1797–1867), the Asantehene (King of the Ashanti) from 1834 until 1867
 Fredua Koranteng Adu (or Freddy Adu) (born 1989), American professional footballer
 Fredua Buadee Benson Erchiah (or Fred Benson) (born 1984), Dutch professional footballer